The McConnell Baronetcy, of The Moat in Strandtown in Belfast, is a title in the Baronetage of the United Kingdom. It was created in 1900 for Robert McConnell, Lord Mayor of Belfast in 1900. The second baronet sat as Unionist member of parliament for Antrim. The fourth baronet did not use his title.

Brian McConnell, Baron McConnell, son of Alfred McConnell, second son of the first baronet, was a politician.

McConnell baronets of The Moat (1900)
Sir Robert John McConnell, 1st Baronet (1853–1927)
Sir Joseph McConnell, 2nd Baronet (1877–1942)
Sir Robert Melville Terence McConnell, 3rd Baronet (1902–1987)
(Robert) Shean McConnell, 4th Baronet (1930–2021)
(Terence) Reade McConnell, 5th Baronet (born 1959)

The heir apparent is the current holder's son, James Alexander McConnell (born 1989)

References

Kidd, Charles, Williamson, David (editors). Debrett's Peerage and Baronetage (1990 edition). New York: St Martin's Press, 1990, 

Baronetcies in the Baronetage of the United Kingdom